Dusit Thani Public Company Limited, branded as Dusit International, is a Thai multinational hospitality company headquartered in Bangkok, Thailand. Dusit International has 36 hotels and resorts in 12 countries.  Founded by Thanpuying Chanut Piyaoui in 1948, the company is now led by Suphajee Suthumpun.

Financials
Dusit International's FY2017 revenues were 5,570 million baht, up from 2016's 5,425 million. Net profits in FY2017 doubled from 2016: from 152 million baht to 332 million. Total assets rose to 9,978 million baht. Total liabilities rose to 4,098 million baht.

The top seven Dusit International executives' remuneration in FY2016 was 57.13 million baht in salary and benefits, up from 32.51 million baht paid to eight executives in 2015.

Dusit Thani PCL has been listed on the Stock Exchange of Thailand (SET) since 1975. Its shares are not actively traded.

History
The group's origin dates back to 1948 when Thanpuying Chanut Piyaoui, opened her first hotel, the "Princess" in Bangkok. It had only 30 rooms but had the distinction of being the first modern hotel in Bangkok with a swimming pool.

The company takes its name and much of its character from the ideas of King Rama VI, whose thoughts on the modern state blended Western and Thai influences. In 1918, he created a utopian miniature city near Lumpini Park and named it Dusit Thani meaning "town in heaven". In Thai, Dusit is the mythological name for the fourth of the seven levels of heaven.

In 1970, the 23 storey Dusit Thani Bangkok became the company's first flagship hotel. The 510-room hotel was the first luxury hotel and the tallest building in Bangkok for several years. In 2017 it was announced that the hotel would be demolished in April 2018. That date has been postponed for eight months: final checkout at the Dusit Thani will be at 14:00, 5 January 2019. The rebuilt hotel will open as part of a 36.7 billion baht mixed-use project to be built in partnership with Central Pattana PLC. When an entirely new Dusit Thani reopens its doors after a three-four year construction period, it will be taller but with fewer rooms – about 300 compared with the current 510.

In 1987, Dusit acquired its first resort property, Dusit Thani Pattaya, followed by another beach resort in Phuket Province, the Dusit Thani Laguna Phuket. In 1989, Dusit Thani Hua Hin, formerly known as the Dusit Resort and Polo Club, opened. Royal Princess Chiang Mai was opened in Chiang Mai in 1991, followed by the Dusit Island Resort Chiang Rai.

In 1995, Dusit International acquired the Hotel Nikko Manila by purchasing shares in the holding company, Philippine Hoteliers, Inc. (PHI), from Japan Airlines Development Company Limited and JAL Trading Inc. After the acquisition, the Hotel Nikko Manila came under the management of Dusit Thani Hotels and Resorts, and was renamed the Dusit Hotel Nikko, Manila. The Manila hotel underwent a major renovation programme and became Dusit Thani Manila in April 2008. It is known for the Supreme Court ruling on "Illegal Strike" which considered the shaving of heads by the employees of Dusit Hotel as tantamount to committing strike. The issue has been protested widely in the Philippines especially with the International Labour Organization's findings that the Philippine government and the Supreme Court violated the workers' right to freedom of expression and association and redefined the meaning of strike.

In November 2006, Dusit Thani added a brand extension, the Dusit Lifestyle Collection with dusitD2 hotels and resorts. dusitD2 is the second generation brand of Dusit Thani Hotels and Resorts. The first property in the dusitD2 collection opened in November 2006 in Chiang Mai. The second dusitD2 hotel, dusitD2 Baraquda Pattaya, was opened in February 2009.

Dusit International's portfolio includes Dusit Princess Hotels and Resorts. The rebirth of the original Princess hotel came with the 1989 opening of the Royal Princess Larn Luang, Bangkok,. There are seven Dusit Princess properties in Thailand. The first Dusit Princess outside Thailand, Dusit Princess City Centre, Dubai, opened in December 2009.

Dusit Thani Dongtai was the first Dusit Thani to launch in China. Dusit Thani Fudu Qingfeng and dusitD2 Fudu Binhu Hotel also opened in 2016 followed by Dusit Thani Dongtai.

The group's other business are hotel management of both Thai and overseas properties, and education, through the Dusit Thani College and a Bangkok culinary school joint venture with Le Cordon Bleu of France. In 1993, Thanpuying Chanut founded Dusit Thani College. In 2009 it initiated a programme with Lyceum of the Philippines University. Additionally, the college opened its new campus in Pattaya in 2011.

In August 2007, the Le Cordon Bleu Dusit Culinary School opened, making it the first of its kind in the Southeast Asian region.

Besides these, The Dusit Executive Development Center (DEDC) was established in 2005 as a subsidiary of Dusit Thani Public Co., Ltd. to provide executive training and development courses to individuals and various organisations.

The dusitD2 Hotel in Nairobi was the scene of the 2019 Nairobi hotel attack.

In April 2018, Dusit International introduced a new mid-market brand called ASAI Hotels

Hotel brands
As of 2019, Dusit International has 36 properties in Thailand, the United Arab Emirates, Qatar, Oman, United States, China, Bhutan, Maldives, Philippines, Vietnam, Egypt and Kenya. Its brands include Dusit Thani Hotels and Resorts, Dusit Princess Hotels and Resorts, dusitD2 Hotels and Resorts, Dusit Devarana Hotels and Resorts and ASAI Hotels.

References

 
Hospitality companies of Bangkok
Companies based in Bangkok
Hospitality companies established in 1948
1948 establishments in Thailand
Companies listed on the Stock Exchange of Thailand
Thai brands
Hotel chains